Prince Arthur of Connaught  (Arthur Frederick Patrick Albert; 13 January 1883 – 12 September 1938) was a British military officer and a grandson of Queen Victoria. He served as Governor-General of the Union of South Africa from 20 November 1920 to 21 January 1924.

Early life

Prince Arthur was born on 13 January 1883 at Windsor Castle. His father was Prince Arthur, Duke of Connaught and Strathearn, third son of Queen Victoria and Prince Albert of Saxe-Coburg and Gotha. His mother was the former Princess Louise Margaret of Prussia.

Arthur was baptised in the Private Chapel of Windsor Castle on 16 February 1883, and his godparents were Queen Victoria (his paternal grandmother), the German Empress (his great-grandaunt, for whom his paternal aunt Princess Beatrice stood proxy), Prince Friedrich Leopold of Prussia (his maternal uncle, who was represented by the German Ambassador Count Münster), Princess Henry of the Netherlands (his maternal aunt, who was represented by Countess Münster), the Duke of Cambridge (his first cousin twice removed), and the Duke of Edinburgh (his paternal uncle, whose brother the Prince of Wales represented him).

Arthur was the first British royal prince to be educated at Eton College. He was known to his family as "young Arthur" to distinguish him from his father.

Military career
Prince Arthur was educated at Eton College, but left there early to enter the Royal Military College, Sandhurst at the age of sixteen years and two months. From there he was commissioned into the 7th (Queen's Own) Hussars as a second lieutenant in May 1901. He saw his first active posting the following year. After the end of the Second Boer War in June 1902, most of the British troops left South Africa, but the 7th Hussars were posted there to keep the peace. Prince Arthur and 230 men of his regiment left Southampton in the SS Ortona in October 1902, and arrived at Cape Town later the same month. He spent several months stationed at Krugersdorp. In 1905, he became an aide-de-camp to his uncle, King Edward VII. In 1907, he was promoted to the rank of captain in the 2nd Dragoons (Royal Scots Greys). He became the honorary Colonel-in-Chief of this regiment in 1920.

During the First World War, Prince Arthur served as aide-de-camp to Generals Sir John French and Sir Douglas Haig, the successive commanders of the British Expeditionary Force in France and Belgium. He was promoted to lieutenant colonel in 1919. In October 1920, Prince Arthur was promoted to the honorary rank of major general. He became a colonel in the reserves in 1922.

Since the king's children were too young to undertake public duties until after the First World War, Prince Arthur carried out a variety of ceremonial duties at home and overseas. This included opening the Scottish National Exhibition, which was held in Saughton Park, Edinburgh. One of the attractions was the Senegal Village with its French-speaking Senegalese residents, on show demonstrating their way of life, art and craft while living in beehive huts.

Marriage

On 15 October 1913, Prince Arthur married his first cousin once removed Princess Alexandra, 2nd Duchess of Fife (17 May 1891 – 26 February 1959) at the Chapel Royal, St. James's Palace, London. She was the eldest daughter and heiress of Alexander Duff, 1st Duke of Fife by his wife Princess Louise the Princess Royal, the eldest daughter of King Edward VII. They had one son Alastair Windsor, 2nd Duke of Connaught and Strathearn.

Later life

After the accession of his cousin, King George V, Prince Arthur and his aging father were the most senior male members of the Royal Family over the age of 18 to reside in the United Kingdom. As such, he undertook a wide variety of royal duties on behalf of the King, and acted as a Counsellor of State during periods of the King's absence abroad.

In 1906, by order of the King, he vested the Meiji Emperor of Japan with the Order of the Garter, as a consequence of the Anglo-Japanese Alliance.  In 1918, he was a guest aboard the Japanese battlecruiser  when she voyaged from Japan to Canada. He visited Tokyo and then Nagoya and was welcomed at Tsuruma Park and the Buntenkaku, and then traveled on to Kyoto. In 1920, Prince Arthur succeeded Viscount Buxton as governor-general and commander-in-chief in South Africa. The Earl of Athlone succeeded him in these posts in 1924. Upon returning to Britain, Prince Arthur became involved in a number of charitable organizations, including serving as chairman of the board of directors of Middlesex Hospital. Like his father, the Duke of Connaught, he was active in the Freemasons, becoming Provincial Grand Master for Berkshire in 1924.

In May 1935, he was appointed High Steward (civic) of Reading, Berkshire, a post which had been vacant since 1910. One of his last public appearances was at the coronation of King George VI and Queen Elizabeth in May 1937.

Prince Arthur of Connaught died of stomach cancer at age 55 on 12 September 1938 at his London home – 41 Belgrave Square, Belgravia, London. His coffin was subsequently taken to the Middlesex Hospital, where Prince Arthur had been the chairman, and his body lay-in-state in the private chapel, with nurses from the hospital keeping vigil. Following his funeral at St George's Chapel, Windsor on 16 September 1938, his remains were interred in the Royal Vault, beneath St George's Chapel on 22 September 1938. On 29 February 1939, he was reburied privately in the Royal Burial Ground, Frogmore. His will was sealed in London in 1939. His estate was valued at £109,418 (or £4.9 million in 2022 when adjusted for inflation). His father, the Duke of Connaught, survived him by four years. Prince Arthur's son, who used the courtesy title Earl of MacDuff after 1917, succeeded his paternal grandfather as 2nd Duke of Connaught and Strathearn and Earl of Sussex in 1942, but died the following year.

Honours and arms

Military ranks
2Lt: 2nd Lieutenant, 7th (Queen's Own) Hussars (8 May 1901)
Lt: Lieutenant, 7th (Queen's Own) Hussars (14 January 1903)
Capt: Captain, 2nd Dragoons (The Royal Scots Greys) (27 April 1907)
Bvt Maj: Brevet Major (14 October 1913)
Maj: Major, 2nd Dragoons (The Royal Scots Greys) (19 August 1915)
Bvt LtCol: Brevet Lieutenant-Colonel (3 June 1919)
 Retired from active service (31 December 1919)
 Hon Maj-Gen: Honorary Major-General (27 October 1920)
Col: Colonel, Reserve of Officers (1 March 1922 to 13 January 1938)

Honours
Orders and appointments
KG: Royal Knight of the Garter (15 July 1902)
KT: Knight of the Thistle (14 October 1913)
PC: Privy Counsellor (11 June 1910)
CB: Companion of the Order of the Bath (18 February 1915)
 Royal Victorian Chain (15 May 1906) – for travelling to Japan and investing Emperor Meiji with the Order of the Garter
GCMG: Knight Grand Cross of the Most Distinguished Order of St Michael and St George (3 September 1918)
GCVO: Knight Grand Cross of the Royal Victorian Order (24 May 1899)
ADC: Personal aide-de-camp to The King (30 June 1905)
GCStJ: Bailiff Grand Cross of St John (12 June 1926)
KJStJ: Knight of Justice of St John (25 July 1905)
 Knight of St. Hubert (Bavaria) (1911)
 Grand Cordon of the Order of Leopold (Belgium)
 Knight of the Elephant (Denmark) (10 May 1914)
 Grand Cordon of the Order of Muhammad Ali (Egypt)
 Grand Cross of the Légion d'honneur (France)
 Grand Cross of the Order of the Redeemer (Greece)
 Grand Cross of the Ludwig Order (Hesse and by Rhine) (26 September 1901)
 Knight of the Annunciation (Italy) (3 December 1904)
 Grand Cordon of the Order of the Chrysanthemum (Japan) (14 February 1906)
 Grand Cross with Collar of the Order of St. Olav (Norway) (13 November 1906)
 Grand Cross of the Red Eagle (Prussia) (4 February 1901)
 Knight of the Seraphim (Sweden) (14 June 1905)
 Grand Cross of the Order of Carol I (Romania)
 Knight of St. Andrew (Russia)
 Knight 3rd Class with Swords of St. Vladimir (Russia)
 Grand Cross with Collar of the Order of Charles III (Spain) (18 May 1907)

Medals
 1914 Star (1917)
 British War Medal (1919)
 Victory Medal (1919)
 Queen Victoria Diamond Jubilee Medal (1897)
 King Edward VII Coronation Medal (1902)
 King George V Coronation Medal (1910)
 King George V Silver Jubilee Medal (1935)
 King George VI Coronation Medal (1937)

Honorary military appointments
Colonel-in-Chief: The Royal Scots Greys (2nd Dragoons), 8 November 1921
Colonel-in-Chief: Royal Army Pay Corps, 11 May 1937

Arms
As a male-line grandchild of a British sovereign, Prince Arthur was awarded, on his twenty-first birthday, the use of the royal arms, with an inescutcheon of the shield of Saxony, and differenced by a label argent, of five points, the outer pair and central point bearing crosses gules, and the inner pair fleur-de-lys azure. In 1917, the inescutcheon was dropped by royal warrant from George V.

Ancestry

References

External links

1883 births
1938 deaths
Connaught, Prince Arthur of
British people of German descent
Deaths from stomach cancer
Connaught, Prince Arthur of
Princes of the United Kingdom
Graduates of the Royal Military College, Sandhurst
Heirs apparent who never acceded
Burials at the Royal Burial Ground, Frogmore
Members of the Privy Council of the United Kingdom
Chancellors of the University of the Witwatersrand
Knights of the Garter
Knights of the Thistle
Knights Grand Cross of the Order of St Michael and St George
Knights Grand Cross of the Royal Victorian Order
Bailiffs Grand Cross of the Order of St John
Companions of the Order of the Bath
Grand Croix of the Légion d'honneur
Recipients of the Order of St. Vladimir, 3rd class
Royal reburials
House of Windsor
House of Saxe-Coburg and Gotha (United Kingdom)